Austria competed at the Eurovision Song Contest 1991, held in Rome, Italy. The Austrian entry was Thomas Forstner with the song "Venedig im Regen", composed by Robby Musenbichler, Hubert Moser and Wolfgang Eltner.

Before Eurovision

National final 
The final was held on 16 March 1991 at the ORF studios in Vienna, hosted by Andreas Steppan and Nicole Fendesack. The winner was decided by televoting (50%) and "expert" jury (50%).

At Eurovision
Forstner performed 6th on the night of the contest, following Switzerland's Sandra Simó's with "Canzone per te" and preceding Luxembourg's Sarah Bray with "Un baiser volé". At the close of the voting the song had received zero points, placing last of 22.

Voting 
Austria did not receive any points at the 1991 Eurovision Song Contest.

References

External links
Austrian National Final 1991

1991
Countries in the Eurovision Song Contest 1991
Eurovision